Tony Costanza (July 2, 1968 – August 4, 2020) was an American drummer, known for being the first drummer for the heavy metal band Machine Head, playing in the band from 1992 to 1993.

Career
Costanza received jazz lessons from Irv Kluger. Influenced by such drummers as Dave Lombardo, Gene Hoglan and Terry Bozzio, whom Tony considered his favorite drummer.

Machine Head
Costanza did two shows with Machine Head. A kegger/house party in Oakland, California and the first "official" Machine Head show in Las Vegas on August 29, 1992.

In 1993, he decided to leave the band, stating, "I left the band, because I was very young and new at playing drums, especially double bass. The band called for a lot of double bass. Basically, out of my own insecurities, I self-destructed. I've suffered a lot from the loss and will never forget not playing in my favorite band ever, but I had to do what was healthy for me and the band. I was even asked to rejoin, if I had certain parts very solid on the double bass aspect of it all, but I still felt I couldn't give the band what they needed."

He wrote the drums for seven songs from their debut album Burn My Eyes: A Thousand Lies, The Rage to Overcome, Death Church, A Nation on Fire, Blood for Blood, I'm Your God Now, and Block (originally titled Fuck it All).

Death 
Constanza died in his sleep on August 4, 2020, aged 52. No official cause of death was revealed.

Discography
With Papsmear
Fear & Loathing in Las Vegas (Demo) (1986)
Lunch for the P.M.R.C. (Demo) (1987)
With Machine Head
Demo (1993)
With Crowbar
Sonic Excess in Its Purest Form (2001)

References

External links
 

1968 births
2020 deaths
American heavy metal drummers